The Sinan Erdem Dome, formerly known as the Ataköy Dome, is a multi-purpose indoor arena that is located in Ataköy, Bakırköy, Istanbul on the European side of Istanbul, Turkey.

It has a seating capacity of 22,500 for concerts. For the sport of basketball, it has a seating capacity of 16,000, and for the sport of tennis, it has a seating capacity of 16,457 people, making it Turkey's largest multi-purpose indoor venue, and the third largest in Europe (although it is not the third largest in Europe in capacity for basketball use). The arena is named after Sinan Erdem (1927–2003), who was the President of the Turkish Olympic Committee, from 1989, until his death in 2003.

Structure of the building
It also has two planar faces on each side, which forms an overall shuttle like geometry. The main load bearing supports of the arena's structure are 6 reinforced concrete twin columns, with an r/c support mass, which holds the tail section of the roof's form. The head section of the roof is fixed to the existing structure.

The steel trusses have fixed supports on top of twin columns. The top and bottom chords are made up of circular hollow sections, which form a triangular shape. There are three main trusses and secondary circular girders that rest on them, which builds up the skeleton structure, while trapezoidal steel sheet covers complete the roofing system. The steel roof and its supports are separate from the tribune structure, constituting an independent structure by itself.

History

Sinan Erdem Dome hosted the basketball 2010 FIBA World Championship's knockout stage and final. During the 2010 FIBA World Championship, most of the arena's 16,000 seats were placed on temporary stands, which were built on top of the arena's permanent stands.

Sinan Erdem Dome has also hosted the following major sporting events: the tennis 2011 WTA Tour Championships, the EuroLeague's 2012 Final Four, the tennis 2012 WTA Tour Championships, the 2012 FINA World Swimming Championships (25 m), and the tennis 2013 WTA Tour Championships.

The arena is also the host site of the major basketball events, the 2017 EuroLeague Final Four and the 2017 FIBA EuroBasket's final stage.

Tenants
The Turkish Basketball Super League (BSL) club Efes İstanbul hosted its home Turkish League and EuroLeague games at the Sinan Erdem Dome, from 2010 to 2012. The Turkish club Fenerbahçe İstanbul also hosted its home games at the arena, from 2010 and until the inauguration of its own arena, the Ülker Sports Arena. The Turkish club Beşiktaş İstanbul also used the arena to host its home games, during the 2015–16 season. Since the 2017/18 season, Anaolu Efes as well as Galatasaray play their games at Sinan Erdem Dome, following the closure of Abdi İpekçi Arena.

The senior men's Turkish national basketball team has also used the arena, since the year 2010.

Major events hosted

References

External links

Miscellaneous Images of Sinan Erdem Dome 
Video Of Sinan Erdem Dome 

Anadolu Efes S.K.
Basketball venues in Turkey
Beşiktaş Basketball
Fenerbahçe Basketball
Indoor arenas in Turkey
Indoor track and field venues
Sport in Bakırköy
Sports venues completed in 2010
Sports venues in Istanbul
Swimming venues in Turkey
Tennis venues in Turkey
Turkish Basketball League venues
Galatasaray S.K. facilities
Galatasaray Basketball